Trainer Glacier is a glacier 7 nautical miles (13 km) west of Rudolph Glacier, flowing northeast to enter Trafalgar Glacier in the Victory Mountains, Victoria Land. Mapped by United States Geological Survey (USGS) from surveys and U.S. Navy air photos, 1960–62. Named by Advisory Committee on Antarctic Names (US-ACAN) for Charles Trainer, meteorologist and senior U.S. representative at Hallett Station, 1960.

Glaciers of Victoria Land
Borchgrevink Coast